Alyaksey Vasilewski (born 2 June 1993) is a Belarusian former professional footballer.

References

External links
 
 
 Profile at Shakhter website

1993 births
Living people
Belarusian footballers
Association football defenders
FC Shakhtyor Soligorsk players
FC Krumkachy Minsk players
FC Baranovichi players